Events from the year 1955 in South Korea.

Incumbents
President: Rhee Syng-man
Vice President: Ham Tae-young

Events
September 18-Democratic Party was founded.

Births

 1 January - Lee Sang-hyun
 8 January-Jun Won-tchack, Korean lawyer and broadcaster
 13 January-Huh Jung-moo  South Korean football player and manager
 16 February - Jeong Sun-ok
 1 July - Yang Gui-ja, Korean novelist 
 11 July - Sim Soo-bong, Korean singer
 28 September - Lee Soon-ok

Death
 18 February - Kim Seong-su, Korean educator, independence activist, journalist
 16 August - Yi Kang, former royal

See also
List of South Korean films of 1955
Years in Japan
Years in North Korea

References

 
South Korea
Years of the 20th century in South Korea
1950s in South Korea
South Korea